Jalkot Taluka is a taluka, administrative subdivision, of Latur District in Maharashtra, India.  The administrative center for the taluka is the village of Jalkot. In the 2011 census there were forty-three panchayat villages in Jalkot Taluka.

Geography
Jalkot Taluka is in the Balaghat Hills.

Notes

External links
 

Jalkot